Urnėžiai (formerly) is a village in Kėdainiai district municipality, in Kaunas County, in central Lithuania. According to the 2011 census, the village has a population of 51 people. It is located 2 km from Dotnuva between the Vištupis and Jaugila rivers. There is a cemetery.

Urnėžiai manor the first time was mentioned in 1581.

Demography

References

Villages in Kaunas County
Kėdainiai District Municipality